The C&N Subdivision is a railroad line owned by CSX Transportation and operated by the Columbus and Ohio River Railroad in the U.S. State of Ohio. At its east end the line continues west from the Columbus and Ohio River Railroad Mt. Vernon Sub and at its west end it connects to the Norfolk Southern Dayton District.

See also
 List of CSX Transportation lines

References

CSX Transportation lines